Alexander Campbell Cameron (30 December 1812 – 5 January 1869), known as Alexander Campbell until 1844, was a British Conservative politician.

Ancestry
The Monzie branch of the Clan Campbell springs from Sir Duncan of Glenorchy, also known as "Black Duncan of Lochow", the patriarch of the house of Breadalbane.  Archibald, a younger son of this old knight, inherited from his father various estates in several of the Highland counties, and transmitted them to his  lineal descendants, the Campbells of Monzie. The original designation was "of Fonab," a property in Perthshire, near Killiecrankie, where Viscount Dundee was slain; and the tradition is, that Claverhouse fell by a shot fired by Fonab himself, or by one of his dependants who followed his chief to the field. The Fonab of 1702 commanded the British troops sent to protect the interests of the colonists of Darien against the attacks of the Spaniards, and obtained a signal and decisive victory  over a vastly more numerous force of the enemy at Toubocante. For this action a gold medal, bearing on one side a plan of the battle, was voted to him by the Directors of the Indian and African Company of Scotland; while the British Crown rewarded him with a grant of a special coat of arms, with supporters, bearing the motto, "Quid non pro patria"; and as this latter honour was bestowed on him as "Campbell of Monzie,".

Early life and education

Alexander Campbell was born  on  30  December  1811,  was  the eldest  son  of  Lieutenant-General  Alexander  Campbell  of  Monzie,  M.P., and  his  wife  Christina  Menzies. Serving  some time  in  Canada  with  that  regiment,  he  changed  into  the  15th  Hussars under  the  Earl  of  Cardigan;  but  in  1835  he  left  the  army,  and  engaged  himself  in  the  management  of  his  landed  property at Monzie,  his  father  having  died in  1832.

Early political career
At the time Campbell  assumed  the  position  of  a  country  gentleman,  the non-intrusion  controversy  was  agitating  all  Scotland ;  and  Mr  Campbell  adopted  the  views  of  the  evangelical  party  in  the  Church. Having  been ordained  an  elder  in  1838,  he  began  still  more  prominently  to  plead  the Church's  cause;  for  instance,  when  in  1840  he  proposed  Home Drummond  on  the  hustings  at  Perth,  he  embodied  in  his  speech  a proposal  for  Parliamentary  interference  to  obviate  the  dead-lock  between  the  ecclesiastical  and  civil  courts,  which  Thomas Chalmers  characterized  as "presenting  a  most  felicitous  solution  of  the  whole  difficulty."

Member of Parliament
In  1841 he  was  returned  M.P.  for  the  county  of  Argyll  without  a  contest. This  motion  he  did  bring 
forward  soon  thereafter,  and  pled  the  expediency  of  such  a  step  with  great  force  of  argument;  but  the  motion  was  lost  by  139  to  62.  These  Parliamentary appearances  so  commended  him  to  the  Church  Defence Committee  in  Scotland,  that,  after  the  Duke  of  Argyll's  Bill  was  coldly  received  in  the  House  of  Lords,  Mr  Campbell  was  requested  to  introduce  a  similar  bill  into  the  House  of  Commons.  Acceding  heartily  to  this  request,  he,  on  14  April  1842,  brought  in  a  "Bill  to  regulate  the 
exercise  of  Church  Patronage  in  Scotland."  Though  not  granting  the  anti-patronage  claims  which  the  Church  regarded  as  the  best  settlement, it is said that  it  would  have  saved  both  the  rights  of  the  people  and  the  Church's  spiritual  independence,  and  thus  have  prevented  the  secession  of  next  year.  When  the  order  of  the  day  for  its  second  reading  was  moved  in  the  beginning  of  May,  Sir  James  Graham,  on  the  part  of  Government,  requested  Mr  Campbell  to  postpone  the  second  reading  for  six  weeks,  as  Government  intended  to  propose  a  course  which  would  put  an  end  to  the  collision  between  the  Church  and  the  civil  courts.  Mr 
Campbell  consented  to  this,  with  the  distinct  proviso,  that,  should  the  Government  measure  prove  unsatisfactory,  he  would  that  day  six  weeks  proceed  with  the  second  reading  of  his  own  Bill;  but  Mr  Fox  Maule,  intimating  his  hopelessness  of  any  proper  measure  from  Government, moved  "That  the  Bill  be  now  read  a  second  time,"  and,  after  some  debate,  Mr  Maule's  amendment  was  lost  by  131  to  48.  Thus  ended  what  was  called  "Monzie's  Bill."  Sir  James Graham's  pledge  was  never  fulfilled,  for  Government  did  nothing.  Most  people  now  saw — and  none  more  plainly  than  Mr  Campbell— that  a  Disruption  was  imminent.  In 
the  prospect  of  this,  a Convocation  of  ministers  was  held  in  Edinburgh,  followed  by  active  arrangements  throughout  many  congregations  in  Scotland  in  preparation  for  the  event.  The  rejection  of  Mr  Fox  Maule's  motion  by  the  House  of  Commons  in  the  spring  of  1843  rendered  the  Disruption  so  certain,  that  Mr  Campbell  left  London 
After  delivering  several  earnest  speeches  in  Scotland  on  the  impending  crisis,  he  resumed  for  a  time  his  place  in  Parliament,  and  wrote  what  has  been  called  "a  solemn  letter  to  Sir  Robert  Peel,  imploring  him  even  at  the  eleventh  hour  to  avert  the  breaking  up  of  the  Church,  by  instantaneous  and  satisfactory  legislative  interposition." All  in  vain. The  General 
Assembly  met.

On  the  very  day  of  the  Disruption,  Mr  Campbell  wrote  a  circular  to  the  Argyllshire  constituency,  intimating  his  resolution  to  resign  his  position  as  their  representative,  having  felt  constrained  in  conscience  to  differ  widely  from  many  of  those  who  had  originally  elected  him.  Being  thus,  as  it  were,  set  free  from  other  influences,  he  devoted  himself  to  promote  the  interests  of  the  Free  Church,  the  object  'nearest  and  dearest  to  his  heart."

Work for the Free Church
Hence  he  was  much  occupied  for  several  years  in  labours  connected  with  the  Sustentation  Fund,  the  General  Assembly,  the  formation  of  the  Evangelical  Alliance,  the  Christian  education  of  the  people,  the  endowment  of  Popery,  the  sanctity  of  the  Sabbath  in  reference  to  railway  traffic,  the  destitution  in  the  Highlands,  and  many 
other  undertakings.  He  also  contributed liberally  to  many  schemes,  specially  those  of  his  own  Church,  giving  £1000  to  the  building  of  the  Free  Church  College 
in  Edinburgh,  £300  to  the  manse  fund,  ;£250  towards  extinguishing  debt  on  Free  Church  buildings,  along  with  notable  yearly  subscriptions  to  the  Sustentation  Fund  in  the  various  districts  where  his  property  was  situated. The  presentation was  made  in  Glasgow,  on  14  April  1846,  by  Dr Thomas Brown,  in  presence  of  an  enthusiastic  audience  ;  while,  on  the  18 May  following,  the  East  of  Scotland  shewed  their  appreciation  of  his  services  by  choosing  him  to  lay  the  foundation  of  the  John  Knox  Memorial 
Church,  hard  by  the  house  of  the  Reformer  in  the  city  of  Edinburgh.

Death and burial
During the last ten years of his life, Mr Campbell laboured under insidious disease, which gradually unhinged his whole nervous system, and rendered him increasingly and painfully unlike his former self. This state of things was much aggravated by several accidents, by which his head was severely injured. He partially recovered strength; but after much suffering, he died at Leamington on 5 January 1869, having just completed the fifty-seventh year of his age.

Mr Campbell's remains were buried in the vault within St Mary's Church, Warwick, where his father and his only son are also  interred.

Family
In May 1844 Mr Campbell married Christina, only child of Sir  Duncan  Cameron  of  Fassfern,  with whom he had three daughters, the eldest of whom was the wife of Henry Spencer Lucy,  Esq., of Charlecote Park, Warwickshire; and the second was married to Colonel J. P. W. Campbell of the Bengal Staff Corps.

References

Citations

Sources

External links
 

UK MPs 1841–1847
Scottish Tory MPs (pre-1912)
1812 births
1869 deaths
Graduates of the Royal Military College, Sandhurst
19th-century Scottish landowners
Free Church of Scotland people